Yellow Medicine East High School is a small town high school (grades 912) located at 450 9th Avenue, Granite Falls, Yellow Medicine County, Minnesota, United States. As of the 20172018 academic year, the school had 216 students.  The school mascot is the "Sting," which resembles the Georgia Tech Yellow Jacket.  The Yellow Medicine East school district is the result of the merger of neighboring communities' schools.  The majority of students from Granite Falls, Clarkfield, Hazel Run, Hanley Falls, Echo  attend Yellow Medicine East Schools.

Notable alumni
 Larry Cole, a former American football defensive lineman in the National Football League for the Dallas Cowboys.

See also
 List of high schools in Minnesota

References

External links
 Yellow Medicine East Schools Website

Public high schools in Minnesota
Schools in Yellow Medicine County, Minnesota